Bjorn Saven (born 1950) is a Swedish industrialist and investor. He is the founder and former chief executive of IK Investment Partners (formerly Industri Kapital) a leading European private equity firm focused on acquisitions across the Nordics, Benelux, Germany and France, with funds raised in excess of €14 billion.

Background 
Saven was born in Stockholm. His father headed a constructions materials company. He and his wife Inger have three adult children.

Education 
Saven holds a Bachelor's degree in Business Administration from Stockholm School of Economics 1972 and an MBA from Harvard University 1976.

Career 
Prior to founding IK Investment Partners in 1988 (within Enskilda Securities until 1993, part of the SEB Bank Group) Bjorn Saven held various positions at the American oil company Gulf Oil 1972-1974 as well as the Swedish office and retail products group Esselte 1976-1988.

At IK Partners, Bjorn Saven pioneered Private Equity investments in the Nordics and Continental Europe. He raised the first Private Equity fund in the Northern Europe, focusing mainly on investments in, and development of, mid-cap companies with a hands-on operating approach of working with portfolio businesses. He served as Chief Executive from 1989-2008 and Executive Chairman 2008 – 2011, Chairman  from 2011 and emeritus since 2017. 

Bjorn Saven has also served as a non-executive director at the Nordic bank Nordea, Swedish industrial group Alfa Laval (Deputy Chairman), Swedish energy group Vattenfall AB, Norwegian consumer goods group Orkla ASA, and Finnish industrial cranes manufacturer Konecranes Oyj.

Saven was chairman of the British-Swedish Chamber of Commerce in Stockholm  for five years and is director of the Swedish Chamber of Commerce for the United Kingdom. He is a member of the Royal Swedish Academy of Engineering Sciences where he served as deputy chairman 20011-2013. He is also a member of the Utrikespolitiska samfundet (The Swedish Society for International Affairs), a non-profit organisation and parent body of Utrikespolitiska institutet, (The Swedish Institute of International Affairs).

Honours 

 H.M. The King's Medal, Sweden (12th size w. the Seraphimer Ribbon) for services to industry (2008) 
 Knight Commander of the Order of Merit of Poland (2022) 
 Officier of the Legion of Honour, France (2021) 
 Knight 1st Class of the Federal Republic of Germany (2007)
Commander of the Kingdom of Belgium (2012)
Commander of the White Rose of Finland (2022)  and of the Order of the Lion (2008)  
 Patron of the Royal College of Surgeons of England (2021)  
Honorary Doctorates from Helsinki (Hanken) (1999), Stockholm Schools of Economics (2011),  and from the Faculty of Engineering (LTH)  at Lund University (2012) 
 Honorary Doctor and member of the Bulgarian Academy of Sciences (2015)  
 Honorary fellow and MA at Harris Manchester College (2017)  and member of the Chancellor’s Court of Oxford University
Medal of Honour, Swedish-Finnish Culture Fund (2012) 
Medaille du Bicentenaire, University of Liège (2017)

Philanthropy 

 Trustee of the National Portrait Gallery in London, and Chairman of the Investment Committee
 Trustee of UK prenatal care charity Tommy’s
 Trustee of the Heart/Lung Foundation of Sweden

References

Stockholm School of Economics alumni
Harvard Business School alumni
1950 births
Businesspeople from Stockholm
Living people
20th-century Swedish businesspeople
21st-century Swedish businesspeople